Robert Abigail (born 1980) is a Dutch DJ.

Biography
Robert Abigail was born and raised in Rotterdam (The Netherlands), where he started his successful DJ career at the age of 15 in a variety of different clubs.

In 2007–2008 he gained international fame by when one of his songs was used in a Bacardi rum commercial. His 2008 single, "Mojito Song", was well received from the commercial and was later released as an independent single which quickly went gold in Europe, reaching number 20 on the Dutch Top 40 and up to number 2 in Ultratop, the Belgian (Flemish) Singles Chart.

He has continued to cooperate with a number of acts, most notably Belgian DJ Rebel and M.O., on many hits in the Netherlands and Belgium with "Merengue" by Robert Abigail and DJ Rebel featuring M.O. as a great follow-up in 2009 to "Mojito Song". Abigail also cooperated with The Gibson Brothers on two hits, "Cuba" and "Non Stop Dance".

Discography

Singles

*Did not appear in the official Dutch Top 40 charts, but rather in the bubbling under Tipparade charts. For Tipparade peaks, added 40 positions to arrive at an equivalent Dutch Top 40 position in above tables
**Did not appear in the official Belgian Ultratop 50 charts, but rather in the bubbling under Ultratip charts. For Ultratip peaks, added 50 positions to arrive at an equivalent Ultratop position

Featured in

References

External links
 Official website

1980 births
Living people
Dutch dance musicians
Dutch DJs
Dutch electronic musicians
Musicians from Rotterdam
Electronic dance music DJs